Gastón Nicolás Fernández (born 12 October 1983) is an Argentine former professional footballer who played as a forward. He spent most of his senior club career in Argentine Primera División side Estudiantes.

Club career

Nicknamed La Gata (The Cat), Fernández began his professional career with River Plate. After a stint with Racing and another season back with River, in 2006 he was loaned to Monterrey. When the contract was finished, Monterrey declined to pay the nearly two million dollars to permanently buy Gastón, thus prompting him to return to River Plate in December 2006.

However, Daniel Passarella, then River's head coach, believed the team had enough strikers. Fernández was therefore sold to San Lorenzo de Almagro. In San Lorenzo La Gata revindictated his career. He was the leading scorer of the team that won the 2007 Clausura championship. He then spent one year in Mexico with Tigres de la UANL.

In 2008, Fernández returned to Argentina to play for Estudiantes de La Plata, where he finished as runner up with the team in the 2008 Copa Sudamericana. He was then a first team regular in the team that won the 2009 Copa Libertadores, where he scored the equalising goal in the second leg of the final against Cruzeiro. Subsequently, he went back to Tigres, where he helped win the 2009 SuperLiga title against Chicago Fire. In January 2010, Tigres released the Argentine winger upon his request, and Fernández returned to Estudiantes. Upon his return, Fernández helped lead Estudiantes to the 2010 Apertura tournament title.

On January 15, 2014, Fernández signed with Major League Soccer club Portland Timbers. On March 8, 2014, La Gata scored an equalizer goal in the 93' of his MLS debut to extend the Timbers' home unbeaten streak to sixteen.  He added a second goal the following game on March 16, 2014 against the Chicago Fire to force another draw.

On August 3, 2015 MLS announced that Fernández and the Timbers had mutually agreed to part ways.

International career
Gastón Fernández has played for several of Argentina's youth teams.

Honours
River Plate
Argentine Primera División: 2003 Clausura
San Lorenzo
Argentine Primera División: 2007 Clausura
Tigres
North American SuperLiga: 2009
Estudiantes
Copa Libertadores: 2009
Argentine Primera División: 2010 Apertura
Grêmio
Copa Libertadores: 2017

References

External links
 Statistics at Guardian Stats Centre
 Argentine Primera statistics at Fútbol XXI  
 

1983 births
Living people
Sportspeople from Lanús
Argentine footballers
Argentine expatriate footballers
Argentine sportspeople of Spanish descent
Association football midfielders
Club Atlético River Plate footballers
Racing Club de Avellaneda footballers
San Lorenzo de Almagro footballers
Estudiantes de La Plata footballers
Universidad de Chile footballers
C.F. Monterrey players
Tigres UANL footballers
Portland Timbers players
Portland Timbers 2 players
Grêmio Foot-Ball Porto Alegrense players
Liga MX players
Chilean Primera División players
Argentine Primera División players
Major League Soccer players
USL Championship players
Copa Libertadores-winning players
Expatriate footballers in Chile
Expatriate footballers in Mexico
Expatriate soccer players in the United States
Expatriate footballers in Brazil
Argentine expatriate sportspeople in Chile
Argentine expatriate sportspeople in the United States
Argentine expatriate sportspeople in Mexico
Argentine expatriate sportspeople in Brazil